Polydrusus impar is a species of weevils belonging to the family Curculionidae.

Subspecies

Description
The elytra are covered with elongated, lanceolate scales. They have a yellowish-brown or green color with metallic luster. The larvae live in the roots of trees. Adults can be found from May to September. These beetles are oligophagous.

Distribution
This species is present in Austria, Bosnia and Herzegovina, Czech Republic, France, Germany, Italy, Slovakia and Switzerland.

Habitat
Polydrusus impar prefers mountainous regions.

References

Entiminae
Beetles described in 1882